Sperra is a small islet south of Lurøya in Tiholmane, part of Thousand Islands, an archipelago south of Edgeøya.

References 

 Norwegian Polar Institute Place Names of Svalbard Database

Islands of Svalbard